Andrew David Farrell,  (born 30 May 1975) is an English rugby union coach, and a former rugby league and rugby union player. He has been head coach of the Ireland national team since 2019.

A dual-code international, Farrell won 34 caps for Great Britain and 11 for England in rugby league, including the 1995 and 2000 World Cups, and 8 for England in rugby union, including the 2007 World Cup. 

He was a goal-kicking  in rugby league, who played for Wigan between 1991 and 2004, winning six Championships and four Challenge Cups, as well as numerous individual awards. He frequently captained Wigan, England and Great Britain. In rugby union, he played for Saracens from 2005 to 2009, mostly as a centre. 

After retiring as a player, Farrell continued in rugby union as a coach, working as an assistant coach with Saracens, Munster, England, Ireland and the British and Irish Lions. He became head coach of Ireland in 2019.  He coached them to a 2–1 series victory against New Zealand in 2022 and a Grand Slam in 2023.

He is the father of England rugby union player and captain Owen Farrell.

Playing career

Rugby league

1990s
Farrell was born in Wigan, Greater Manchester and first played rugby league at age 10 at a summer camp run by Graeme West, Wigan Warriors' captain at the time. Farrell is of Irish descent. After developing with local club Orrell St James, he made his first-team début for his hometown club Wigan at the age of 16 in 32–8 victory over Keighley in the 1991–92 Regal Trophy match at Central Park, Wigan on Sunday 24 November 1991. Also that year his son Owen Farrell was born, who also went on to become a professional rugby union player.

Farrell became the youngest player to win a Challenge Cup Final in 1993 when at 17 years and 11 months he came on as a substitute against Widnes. He then became a full international by the age of 18, making his début against New Zealand later in 1993.

He rates this as one of his greatest achievements in rugby league. Farrell was selected to play for Great Britain against Australia in all three Ashes Tests of the 1994 Kangaroo tour. The following year he played from the bench for Wigan in the 1995 Challenge Cup Final victory over Leeds Rhinos. Also that year, Farrell married the elder sister of future Great Britain international and Wigan captain Sean O'Loughlin.

In July 1996 Farrell was appointed Wigan Warriors' captain and later that year, aged 21 years and four months, became the youngest-ever captain of the Great Britain team, leading the 1996 Lions tour of New Zealand, Papua New Guinea and Fiji. In October that year he won the prestigious Man of Steel Award. He was awarded the Harry Sunderland Trophy as man-of-the-match.

2000s
In the post-season he was selected to captain England in the 2000 Rugby League World Cup. In 2001 Farrell set the Wigan club record for most points in a season with 429 and most points in a Super League championship season with 388. He is only the second Wigan Warriors player to score more than 3,000 points in all competitions. He celebrated his testimonial match in 2002 and also captained Wigan to victory in the 2002 Challenge Cup.

He was inducted into the Order of the British Empire for services to the game in the New Year's list of 2004. He won the Players' Player Award and twice won the Man of Steel Award. Now Britain's oldest international, Farrell was then selected in the Great Britain team to compete in the end-of-season 2004 Rugby League Tri-Nations tournament. Farrell was awarded the Golden Boot as the best player in the world in 2004. He retired while second on the list of the England rugby league side's all-time top goal scorers (behind George Fairbairn), with 78 points.

Rugby union
On 24 March 2005 Farrell announced his retirement from rugby league in order to play at Saracens, and the Rugby Football Union. A series of injuries and accidents (including a car crash) meant that his début in the 15-man code was delayed until 2006. He finally made a try-scoring début for Saracens reserves on 11 September 2006. Farrell then made his first-team début against Newcastle Falcons on 17 September 2006 as a replacement. On both occasions he played as blind-side flanker. A row then broke out about his best position: the England management suggested he should be playing in the centre, while Saracens continued to play him as a flanker. However Farrell went on to play primarily at centre for the Saracens first team, and again when selected to play for a World XV against South Africa. He was selected as a part of the England Elite squad for the 2007 Six Nations by new coach Brian Ashton. He was seen by some to be the main contender for the starting inside centre position, after England's problems in that position during the 2006 autumn internationals.

Farrell made his England début at Twickenham after he was named at inside centre in the first Six Nations game against Scotland. The 2007 World Cup saw Farrell starting at inside centre against South Africa, in England's chastening group stage defeat. He was then brought on as a replacement against Tonga, and scored his first England try. However, after being picked for the quarter-final decider against Australia he had to withdraw with a calf injury. Unfortunately he never produced the performances for the England union side for which many had hoped, and ultimately he won only eight caps. In January 2008 Farrell was joined at Saracens by his 16-year-old son Owen Farrell, who signed a three-year academy deal with the club. In August 2008 Farrell was named co-captain for the 2008–09 season along with Steve Borthwick. There were rumours of Farrell returning to rugby league and rejoining Wigan Warriors, after it emerged that Saracens head coach Eddie Jones had become unhappy with the direction his club was taking. It was rumoured that Jones and Farrell could be moving up north, with the Warriors becoming increasingly impatient with out-of-favour Brian Noble especially after their poor start to the season; however this proved to be unfounded, with the Warriors instead hiring Melbourne Storm assistant coach Michael Maguire. In April 2009 Farrell announced his retirement and said he was taking up a coaching role with Saracens at the end of the season.

Coaching career

Saracens and England
Farrell was promoted to Saracens first-team coach at the end of 2010 after impressing as skills coach. The RFU announced on 8 December 2011 that both he and Graham Rowntree were to join the national coaching team, led by Stuart Lancaster, for the 2012 Six Nations championship. After the successful campaign Farrell was given the chance to become a permanent part of the England coaching team, but decided to return to Saracens. However, Farrell soon left the London club. 

The RFU announced on 28 June 2012 that Farrell would join the England coaching team on a three-and-a-half-year contract.
Farrell toured with the British and Irish Lions in 2013 as defence coach, having proved himself with England. He was heavily praised by head coach Warren Gatland, having drilled the team to concede very few points during the 10-match tour.

On 15 December 2015, following the resignation of head coach Stuart Lancaster on 11 November 2015, newly appointed head coach Eddie Jones sacked Farrell along with the rest of the coaching team.

Munster and Ireland
On 6 January 2016, it was announced that Farrell would take up the role of Ireland defence coach after the completion of the 2016 Six Nations Championship. As his previous contract with England prevented him from working with an international team until April 2016, Farrell joined Irish province Munster in January 2016 in a temporary advisor role that was to last for four months.

On 26 November 2018 it was announced that Ireland head coach Joe Schmidt would step down after the 2019 Rugby World Cup with Farrell taking over as head coach.
His first game in charge was against Scotland at the Aviva Stadium on 1 February 2020 in the 2020 Six Nations Championship Ireland won this game 19-12 and went on to finish in third place in the delayed Six Nations Championship.
Ireland finished in third place again in the 2021 Six Nations Championship, losing games against Wales and France. On 13 November 2021, in the Autumn internationals, Ireland defeated New Zealand 29–20.

Ireland won 29–7 against Wales in their opening fixture of the 2022 Six Nations Championship on 5 February, before losing 30–24 defeat away to France on 12 February. They won the next game 57–6 against Italy on 27 February, before a 32–15 away win against England on 12 March. A 26–5 win at home against Scotland on 19 March was enough to secure the Triple Crown for Ireland and a second-place finish in the championship. On 9 July 2022, Andy Farrell's side had a historical win in New Zealand beating the All Blacks 23–12 in Dunedin in the second match of the 2022 New Zealand tour. This was Ireland's first ever victory against the All Blacks on New Zealand soil. A week later, they were victorious once again in Wellington beating the All Blacks 32–22 to win the series. Following that victory Ireland officially became the world number one team for the second time in their history.

Personal life
Farrell married Colleen O’Loughlin, the sister of his former Wigan teammate Sean O’Loughlin, in 1995 and has four children, including England rugby union player Owen Farrell.

Record
Previous clubs: Orrell St. James

Super League record at Wigan Warriors 1996–2004 
Played – 368
Tries – 77
Goals – 1026
Drop Goals – 16
Points – 3135

References

External links
Andy Farrell | Rugby Database Coaching Profile
Statistics at wigan.rlfans.com (RL)
(archived by web.archive.org) Profile at saracens.com (RU)
(archived by web.archive.org) Profile at england-rugby.com (RU)
(archived by web.archive.org) 2001 Ashes profile (RL)
Frustration fuels Farrell return (RU)
Commentary on Farrell's first International Union match (RU)
Commentary on Farrell's first International Union match 2 (RU)
Farrell's record as captain of both England and Great Britain in Rugby League at leaguefreak.com (RL)
Andrew Farrell photo by sportingheroes.net
(archived by web.archive.org) Ashton resists temptation to clear decks (RU)

1975 births
Living people
Dual-code rugby internationals
England international rugby union players
England national rugby league team captains
England national rugby league team players
English rugby league players
English rugby union players
English people of Irish descent
Farrell family
Great Britain national rugby league team captains
Great Britain national rugby league team players
Ireland national rugby union team coaches
Lancashire rugby league team players
Officers of the Order of the British Empire
Rugby league players from Wigan
Rugby league five-eighths
Rugby league locks
Rugby league props
Rugby league second-rows
Rugby union centres
Rugby union flankers
Rugby union fly-halves
Rugby union players from Wigan
Saracens F.C. players
Wigan Warriors captains
Wigan Warriors players